Igor Werner (born 22 March 1974) is a German strongman competitor and entrant to the World's Strongest Man competition.

Biography
Werner started with training in 1997. The first tournament he won as a strongman was the Newcomer Cup in Ditzingen 2001. In 2007 he became Germany's Strongest Man for the first time after placing second behind Heinz Ollesch the previous year. In 2008 he finished second behind Florian Trimpl in Germany's Strongest Man. the same year he was invited for the World's Strongest Man where he finished last in his qualifying heat and did not qualify for the final. In 2010 he became Germany's Strongest Man for the second time.

Strongman competition record 
 2006
 2. - Germany's Strongest Man
 2007
 1. - Germany's Strongest Man
 2008
 2. - Germany's Strongest Man
 11. Strongman Champions League Serbia
 Q.  - 2008 World's Strongest Man
 2010
 1. - Germany's Strongest Man

References

External links
 Personal website
 Igor Werner on gfsa-strongman.de

1974 births
Living people
German strength athletes